Joseph Yao Dziwornu-Mensah is a Ghanaian politician and member of the first parliament of the second republic of Ghana representing Some-Aflao Constituency under the membership of the National Alliance of Liberals (NAL).

Education and early life 
He was born 9 September 1934 in Volta Region of Ghana. He attended Winneba Training College where he obtained Teachers' Training Certificate. He also obtained his Bachelor of Arts degree from The University of Ghana, Legon  and he attended Kumasi College of Technology.

Politics 
He began his political career in 1969 when he became the parliamentary candidate for the National Alliance of Liberals (NAL) to represent Some-Aflao constituency prior to the commencement of the 1969 Ghanaian parliamentary election. He assumed office as a member of the first parliament of the second republic of Ghana on 1 October 1969 after being pronounced winner at the 1969 Ghanaian parliamentary election and was later suspended following the overthrow of the Busia government on 13 January 1972.

Personal life 
He is a Catholicism. He was a Teacher and Police Officer.

See also 

 Busia government
 List of MPs elected in the 1969 Ghanaian parliamentary election

References 

1934 births
People from Volta Region
Ghanaian MPs 1969–1972
Ghanaian police officers
University of Ghana
Living people